Mufwankolo Wa Lesa (12 July 1935 – 17 February 2021) was a Congolese humorist and theatre director. He made significant contributions to the theatrical and cultural scene in Katanga.

References

People from Katanga Province
Place of death missing
African comedians
Democratic Republic of the Congo theatre people
1935 births
2021 deaths